Kimbara is the brand name of a range of guitars which were commissioned by the UK-based musical instrument wholesaler FCN Music.

The brand name was first registered on 2 January 1968 and the guitar production involved FCN Music commissioning guitars from various factories across the Far East.

Initially guitars were produced in Japan, then in the late 1980s guitars were sourced from Korea, and in the late 1990s instrument production moved to factories in China.

The Kimbara brand mark has been used on classical, steel strung, and electric guitars and basses.

The price of a Kimbara guitar put it in the 'budget' range of guitars (The 8/Y model was available from 1977–1990 and its last UK RRP was £186.00). But they were nonetheless attractively designed, well made, and had surprisingly good tone for the price.

A fine example being the Kimbara KS 570EQ,Korean made, bowl back, semi acoustic.
It has a narrow neck, making it a very playable guitar for people who have trouble with the standard width necks.
Green body and leaf style veneer surrounding multiple sound holes. Built in EQ.

References

Guitars